Angel Light is a novel by Roman Catholic priest and author Father Andrew M. Greeley. It is the second of a short series - currently of three.

Reviews

 Abstract: Reviews the book `Angel Light,' by Andrew M. Greeley.
 Abstract: Reviews the book `Angel Light: An Old-Fashioned Love Story,' by Andrew M. Greeley.

References

External links

1995 American novels
Novels by Andrew M. Greeley
Forge Books books